Jeffrey R. Hall (born 5 July 1957) is an English professional golfer.

Hall was born in Bristol. He turned professional in 1976 and joined the European Tour the following year. He finished in the top one hundred of the European Tour Order of Merit seven times (1978–84) with a best ranking of 28th in 1983. His sole European Tour win came at the 1983 Jersey Open. He also won the 1992 Memorial Olivier Barras on the second tier Challenge Tour.

Professional wins (3)

European Tour wins (1)

Challenge Tour wins (2)

Results in major championships

Note: Hall only played in The Open Championship.
CUT = missed the halfway cut (3rd round cut in 1984 Open Championship)

External links

English male golfers
European Tour golfers
Sportspeople from Bristol
1957 births
Living people